William Hauritz AM is the director of the Woodford Folk Festival held annually in Queensland, Australia. In 2018, he was named as one of the Queensland Greats by Queensland Premier Annastacia Palaszczuk in a ceremony at the Queensland Art Gallery on 8 June 2018.

The festival is the biggest community-driven cultural event in Australia, injecting millions into the Queensland economy annually. It is acclaimed for its inclusivity, optimism and exploration of ideas, welcoming more than one million interstate and overseas visitors, and has received multiple national and state tourism awards. Under Hauritz’s leadership the festival has extended its reach to regional Queensland communities, engaged more than 47,000 volunteers, helped build arts sector capacity both locally and across Queensland, created opportunities for more than 30,000 artists while fostering new generations of talent, strengthened relations with traditional owners of the festival site and is a model of environmental innovation in the festival sector.

Hauritz was made a Member of the Order of Australia (AM) in the 2005 Australia Day Honours for "service to the community, particularly through the establishment of the Woodford Folk Festival and leadership roles in organisations that provide a forum for the promotion of cross-cultural and artistic awareness".

Awards

Queensland Music Awards
The Queensland Music Awards (previously known as Q Song Awards) are annual awards celebrating Queensland, Australia's brightest emerging artists and established legends. They commenced in 2006.

 (wins only)
|-
| 2011
| himself
| Grant McLennan Lifetime Achievement Award 
| 
|-
|}

References

Attribution 
This article was based on material from 2018 Queensland Greats recipients © The State of Queensland 2018, released under CC-BY-4.0 license, accessed on 27 October 2018.

External links

People from Queensland
Queensland Greats
Living people
Festival directors
Members of the Order of Australia
Year of birth missing (living people)